Gotland Military Command (MKG) previously VII Military District was a military district, and later a command in the Swedish Armed Forces. It existed between the years 1942 and 2000. The staff of the military district was located within Gotland Garrison in Visby on Gotland.

History
Gotland Military Command was established on 1 October 1942 as the VII Military District (VII. militärområdet) and was commanded by a military commander which had the responsibility of the territorial and land operational task. In 1966 the name was changed to Gotland Military Command and was included as a command in the Eastern Military District (Milo Ö). This was done in accordance with the new model in which Gotland was too small for a military district. Simultaneously, the operational tasks of the commanders of the naval commands and destroyer squadrons were given to the military commander, which meant that the military commander had full responsibility for the overall operational management of all military forces within the military district.

In 1991, Gotland Military Command became a part of the newly formed Middle Military District (Milo M), but remained as a staff until the Defence Act of 2000, when the staff was phased out and replaced in part by the Gotland Military District (MD G).

Organisation

A 7 Gotland Artillery Regiment, Visby. (1942–2000)
KA 3 Gotland Coastal Artillery Regiment, Fårösund. (1942–2000)
Lv 2 Gotland Anti-Aircraft Corps, Visby. (1963–2000)
I 18 Gotland Infantry Regiment, Visby (1887–1963)
P 18 Gotland Regiment, Visby. (1963–2000)
MD G Gotland Naval District, Visby. (1942–1956)
MekB 18 Gotland Brigade, Visby. (1949–2000)

Heraldry
The coat of arms of the Gotland Military Command used from 1982 to 1994. Blazon: "Azure, the provincial badge of Gotland, a ram passant argent, armed or, cross and banner gules, staff, edging and five flaps or. The shield surmounted two swords in saltire or."

The coat of arms of the Gotland Military Command Staff (Gotlands militärkommandostab) used from 1994 to 2000 and the Gotland Military District Staff from 2000 to 2004. Blazon: "Azure, the provincial badge of Gotland, a ram passant argent, armed or, cross and banner gules, staff, edging and five flaps or. The shield surmounted an erect sword or".

Commanding officers
The rank abbreviations refer to rank when the person took command and after any promotion in that position.

VII Military District

1942-10-01 – 1948-09-30: Maj. Gen. Samuel Åkerhielm
1948-10-01 – 1955-03-31: Maj. Gen. Ivar Backlund
1955-04-01 – 1955-09-30: Maj. Gen. Thord  Bonde
1955-10-01 – 1957-03-31: Maj. Gen. Hilding Kring
1957-04-01 – 1959-09-30: Maj. Gen. Regner Leuhusen
1959-10-01 – 1963-09-30: Maj. Gen. Fale Burman
1963-10-01 – 1966-09-30: Maj. Gen. Karl Gustaf Brandberg

Gotland Military Command

1966-10-01 – 1968-09-30: Maj. Gen. Karl Gustaf Brandberg
1968-10-01 – 1971-09-30: Maj. Gen. Fredrik Löwenhielm
1971-10-01 – 1980-09-30: Maj. Gen. Kjell Nordström
1980-10-01 – 1983-03-31: Maj. Gen. Bengt Tamfeldt
1983-04-01 – 1988-03-31: Maj. Gen. Lars-Eric Wahlgren
1988-04-01 – 1994-06-30: Maj. Gen. Sven-Åke Jansson
1994-07-01 – 2000-06-30: Maj. Gen. Göran De Geer

Chiefs of Staff
Chiefs of Staff of MB and MKG:

1937-07-01 – 1938-09-30: MAJ B S Pontén, (Gst)
1938-10-01 – 1940-09-30: MAJ W C G Möller, (Gst)
1940-10-01 – 1943-09-30: MAJ/LTC N Falk, (Gst)
1943-10-01 – 1944-06-30: LTC B Ingvarsson, (Gst)
1944-07-01 – 1945-09-30: MAJ A E Franke, (Gst)
1945-10-01 – 1949-03-31: MAJ S G A V Hamilton, (Gst)
1949-04-01 – 1952-03-31: MAJ N I Juhlin, (Gst)
1952-04-01 – 1956-09-30: MAJ S Eriksson, (Gst)
1956-10-01 – 1961-03-31: MAJ/LTC Åke Bernström, (Gst)
1961-04-01 – 1964-03-31: MAJ/LTC Bertil Creutzer, (Gst)
1964-04-01 – 1966-09-30: MAJ/LTC Gustaf Malmström, (Gst)
1966-10-01 – 1969-03-31: LTC Eric Jarneberg, (KA)
1969-04-01 – 1972-09-30: LTC Sven-Åke Adler, (KA)
1972-10-01 – 1975-09-30: LTC Lennart Sölvinger, (KA)
1975-10-01 – 1978-09-30: LTC S Kristensson, (KA)
1978-10-01 – 1982-09-30: LTC P Lundbeck, (KA)
1982-10-01 – 1986-09-30: LTC Göte Dygéus, (KA)
1986-10-01 – 1993-04-30: LTC C Eklund, (KA)
1993-05-01 – 1995-09-30: LTC T Fåhraeus, (KA)
1995-10-01 – 1998-03-31: COL Bengt Delang, (KA)
1998-04-01 – 2000-06-30: LTC/COL Jörgen Bergmark, (KA)

Names, designations and locations

Footnotes

References

Notes

Print

External links
 Gotland Military History  

Joint commands of Sweden
Disbanded units and formations of Sweden
Military units and formations established in 1942
Military units and formations established in 2000
1942 establishments in Sweden
2000 disestablishments in Sweden
Visby Garrison